Dormani Poudel was sworn in as Chief Minister of Bagmati Province on 12 February 2018. Here is the list of ministers.

Chief Minister & Cabinet Ministers 
Current

Till March 2021

See also  
 Sher Dhan Rai cabinet
 Lalbabu Raut cabinet
 Krishna Chandra Nepali cabinet
 Kul Prasad KC cabinet
 Mahendra Bahadur Shahi cabinet
 Trilochan Bhatta cabinet

References

External links 

 Office of Chief Minister and Council of Ministers of Bagmati Province

Provincial cabinets of Nepal
Bagmati Province